Neogondolellla is an extinct genus of conodonts. Neogondolela regalis was re-evaluated in 2018 by Martyn Lee Golding.

References

Conodonts